Teana can refer to following:

 Teana, a town in Italy
 Teana, a village located in the Fangatau Atoll.
 Nissan Teana, a Japanese car
 Teana Lanster, an anime character

See also 
 Tiana (disambiguation)